Ahmadabad (also Romanized as Aḩmadābād; also known as Ahmad Abad Abarghoo and Aḩmadābād-e Abrqū) is a village in Tirjerd Rural District, in the Central District of Abarkuh County, Yazd Province, Iran. At the 2006 census, its population was 259, in 72 families.

References 

Populated places in Abarkuh County